Siu Hang Tsuen is the name of two villages in Hong Kong:

 Siu Hang Tsuen (North District), in Lung Yeuk Tau, Fanling, North District
 Siu Hang Tsuen (Tuen Mun District), in Tuen Mun District